The 1868 Halifax by-election was a by-election held in England on 21 December 1868 for the House of Commons constituency of Halifax in the West Riding of Yorkshire. The by-election was held due to the incumbent Liberal MP, James Stansfeld, becoming Lord Commissioner of the Treasury.  It was retained by Stansfeld who was unopposed.

References

1868 elections in the United Kingdom
1868 in England
19th century in Yorkshire
December 1868 events
Elections in Calderdale
Halifax, West Yorkshire
By-elections to the Parliament of the United Kingdom in West Yorkshire constituencies
Unopposed ministerial by-elections to the Parliament of the United Kingdom in English constituencies